Refugio Tanori was a Mexican soldier and a member of the Opata People. He was born in the town of Álamos in 1835.

During the Reform War he fought on the side of the conservatives with the rank of captain, joining his brother Juan Tanori. After the conservatives lost the war, Tanori was amnestied.

In 1865, he joined the forces of the Second Mexican Empire, and on October 5 of that year Emperor Maximilian granted him the rank of general and granted him a cross from the Order of Guadalupe.

He played a role in the siege of Ures, freed the Algerian prisoners held at San Pedro, Sinaloa, and he defeated Jesús García Morales at Nacori Grande. He played an important rule during the defense of Hermosillo and at the Battle of Guadalupe.

As the Empire began to falter in 1866, especially in the northern provinces, he headed towards Guaymas and sought to escape to Baja California, but the ship on which he had disembarked with other imperialist officials and officers was overtaken by another ship commanded by the liberal colonel Próspero Salazar Bustamante, and Tanori was apprehended. He was shot by firing squad, along with the rest of his companions, at the orders of the liberal general Ángel Martinez, on September 25, 1866. As he stood before the firing squad, his last words were

See also
Yaqui Wars
Second Mexican Empire
Second French Intervention in Mexico

References

Conservatism in Mexico
People from Sonora
1835 births
1866 deaths
Mexican monarchists
19th-century Mexican military personnel
People executed by Mexico by firing squad